Pezotettix giornae is a species of 'short-horned grasshoppers' belonging to the subfamily Pezotettiginae (similar to and previously placed in the Catantopinae).

Distribution
This very little grasshopper is present in Southern Europe (and parts of Central Europe), North Africa and in the Near East.

Habitat

This species inhabits meadows of lowlands, forest edges, xerotherm areas of plains and southern slopes of stony mountains.

Description
The basic coloration of the body varies from light brown to greyish. The eyes are relatively large and the sides of thorax sometimes show a white or darker longitudinal stripe. The wings are scaly, oval, very short, reaching only the middle of the second rear segment, so they are unable to fly and  resemble nymphs (brachyptery). Nymphs are usually green in the early stages.

Biology
This immature stages of this species develop in summer, passing through six instars. Adults can be encountered from June through November in the Mediterranean. They mate in autumn and in winter and often overwinter as adults. In this case they can be found by March.

References

External links

 Orthoptera Species

Acrididae
Insects described in 1794
Orthoptera of Europe